The men's synchronized 10 metre platform competition at 2013 World Aquatics Championships was held on July 21 with the preliminary round in the morning and the final in the evening session.

Results
The preliminary round was held at 10:00 and the final at 17:30.

Green denotes finalists

References

Men's 10 m synchro platform